Why Can't You is the third studio album by the American country music singer Larry Stewart and his final album for Columbia Records. It was released in 1996. Singles released from the album were "Why Can't You" and "Always a Woman", which respectively reached #46 and #70 on the Billboard country singles charts.

Thom Owens gave the album three stars out of five in Allmusic, where he wrote that it "suffers from an uneven selection of material and production that plays it too close to the vest".

Track listing
"They Ain't Made Enough Road" (Wendell Mobley, Tom Shapiro) – 2:31
"Always a Woman" (J. Fred Knobloch, Steve O'Brien) – 3:37
"That's What One Night Can Do" (Michael Huffman, Donny Kees, Bob Morrison) – 3:37
"There Goes the Neighborhood" (Bob DiPiero, John Scott Sherrill, Pebe Sebert) – 2:35
"I've Got My Hands Full" (Tony Martin, Brenda Sweat, Cal Sweat) – 3:40
"Shake, Rattle and Rollin' in the Country" (Jamie O'Hara) – 3:01
"Why Can't You" (Larry Stewart, R.C. Bannon) – 3:50
"This Heart" (Stewart, Bannon) – 4:25
"I'll Know When I Get  There" (Angelo Petraglia, Robert Ellis Orrall, Curtis Wright) – 2:57
"As Time Goes" (Tony Haselden, Tim Mensy) – 4:00

Personnel
 Deborah Allen - background vocals
 Jerry Douglas - dobro, slide guitar
 Dan Dugmore - steel guitar
 Glen Duncan - fiddle, mandolin
 Stuart Duncan - fiddle, mandolin
 Paul Franklin - steel guitar
 Vince Gill - background vocals
 Emory Gordy Jr. - bass guitar, acoustic guitar
 Jimmy Hall - harmonica
 Dann Huff - electric guitar
 Patty Loveless - background vocals
 Brent Mason - electric guitar
 Steve Nathan - keyboards
 Robert Ellis Orrall - background vocals
 Larry Stewart - lead vocals, background vocals
 Harry Stinson - background vocals
 Biff Watson - acoustic guitar
 Dennis Wilson - background vocals
 Lonnie Wilson - bass guitar, drums

References

1996 albums
Albums produced by Emory Gordy Jr.
Columbia Records albums
Larry Stewart (singer) albums